Botting may refer to:

Surname 
 Anna Botting (born 1967), British TV news anchor
 Cam Botting (born 1954), Canadian professional ice hockey forward
 Douglas Botting (1934–2018), English explorer, author, biographer and TV presenter and producer
 Francis Joseph Botting (1819–1906), auctioneer in Adelaide, South Australia
 Gary Botting (born 1943), Canadian lawyer, legal scholar, naturalist, playwright and poet 
 Graham Botting (1915–2007), New Zealand cricketer
 James Botting (1783–1857), hangman at Newgate Prison in London
 Louise Botting (born 1939), journalist, radio presenter and company director
 Ralph Botting (born 1955), former Major League Baseball pitcher
 Stephen Botting (1845–1927), English cricketer
 Steve Botting (born 1959), Canadian sprint canoeist

Other 
 Internet bot, software application that runs automated tasks over the internet
 Video game bot, an automated player in a video game

Surnames of English origin